Adlène Boutnaf (born 23 February 1984 in Hussein Dey, Algiers) is an Algerian professional footballer. He currently plays as a defender for the Algerian Ligue 2 club Olympique de Médéa.

Statistics

References

External links

Soccerway profile

1984 births
Living people
Algerian footballers
Olympique de Médéa players
CR Belouizdad players
NA Hussein Dey players
USM Bel Abbès players
OMR El Annasser players
AS Khroub players
MC Saïda players
Footballers from Algiers
Algerian Ligue Professionnelle 1 players
Algerian Ligue 2 players
Algeria under-23 international footballers
Association football defenders
21st-century Algerian people